Coláiste Eoin is a Catholic voluntary secondary  (Irish language school) for boys, under the trusteeship of the Edmund Rice Schools Trust, in Booterstown, County Dublin, Ireland. It has hurling and Gaelic football teams, traditional Irish music bands, and Irish language debating teams. The school is financed by resources from the Department of Education and Skills and voluntary donations.

Notable past pupils

 Dara Ó Briain – Stand-up Comedian and Television Presenter
 Peter Coonan - Actor, known for his role as Fran Cooney in the RTÉ One series Love/Hate,
 John Crown - Senator, member of 24th Seanad, consultant oncologist.
 Pádraig Cusack – Theatre Producer for the Royal National Theatre, London, Abbey Theatre and NCPA, Mumbai
 Ian Daly – Footballer playing for Dulwich Hamlet in the lower divisions of the English football leagues
 David Odlum - Former guitarist with Kíla and the Frames, now produces and records bands in France
 Liam Ó Maonlaí, Fiachna Ó Braonáin – Members of The Hothouse Flowers
 Colm Ó Cíosóig - Member of My Bloody Valentine
 Colm Ó Maonlaí – Actor in various films and TV shows including British soap EastEnders
 Colm Mac Con Iomaire – Solo artists Member of The Frames, former member of Kíla
 Fiach Mac Conghail – Director of the Abbey Theatre and Senator
 Colm Mac Eochaidh – High Court judge
 John Mulholland (Journalist) - Editor of Guardian newspaper (US), Former-editor of the Observer.
 Con O'Callaghan (Gaelic footballer) - Dublin Senior County Footballer, All Ireland medal winner
 Aengus Ó Snodaigh – Historian, author and Sinn Féin TD, spokesperson on Social Protection and Communities
 Ciarán Ó Cofaigh - TV and Film Producer and director of ROSG (Cré na Cille) and Eo Teilfís
 Rossa Ó Snodaigh - Kíla multi-instrumentalist, composer for theatre and dance, author, producer and director of radió drama, TV presenter and director of An Puball Gaeilge at the Electric Picnic
 Davy Spillane – Uilleann pipe player and founding member of Moving Hearts
 Lorcan Tucker - Irish international cricketer

Notable past teachers
 Tony Gregory – Independent TD

Campus

The school is 6 km from the Dublin city centre. The campus incorporates Coláiste Eoin and Coláiste Íosagáin's original 1970s-built buildings, a science block, an arts block, the newly built 3-storey classroom block and sports hall, and a large sports field with a football and hurling pitch.

Coláiste Íosagáin
Coláiste Íosagáin is an Irish language Catholic voluntary secondary Gaelscoil for girls under the trusteeship of the Sisters of Mercy, which shares a campus with Coláiste Eoin. It was established in 1971, two years after Coláiste Eoin's establishment, to provide an Irish language education for girls in the South County Dublin Dublin area.

References

External links
 Coláiste Eoin Irish-English Phrasebook and Forógra Choláiste Eoin

1969 establishments in Ireland
Booterstown
Boys' schools in the Republic of Ireland
Congregation of Christian Brothers secondary schools in the Republic of Ireland
Educational institutions established in 1969
Gaelcholáiste
Irish-language education
Secondary schools in Dún Laoghaire–Rathdown